The 2011 MTV EMAs (also known as the MTV Europe Music Awards) were held in Northern Ireland's capital Belfast, on Sunday, 6 November 2011, at the Odyssey Arena in the Titanic Quarter area of the city and was hosted by Selena Gomez. Additional live venues for the awards show include Ulster Hall and Belfast City Hall.

On 19 September 2011, MTV Networks International announced the 2011 nominees. The main categories were dominated by Lady Gaga with seven  nominations, Katy Perry and Bruno Mars with five and Britney Spears, Thirty Seconds to Mars and Adele with three apiece. Lady Gaga was the biggest winner of the night, taking home 4 awards. Other winners include Thirty Seconds to Mars, Bruno Mars and Justin Bieber with two apiece.

During the show Selena Gomez said that MTV received 154 million votes from people around the globe. Queen received the Global Icon Award from Katy Perry, and the band closed the awards ceremony, with Adam Lambert on vocals, performing "The Show Must Go On", "We Will Rock You" and "We Are the Champions".

Nominations 
Winners are in bold text.

Regional nominations 
Winners are in bold text.

Worldwide Act nominations
Winners are in bold text.

Performances

Pre show
Jason Derülo — "It Girl / In My Head"

Main show
Coldplay — "Every Teardrop Is a Waterfall"
LMFAO (featuring Lauren Bennett and GoonRock) — "Party Rock Anthem"
Bruno Mars — "Marry You"
Jessie J — "Price Tag"
Red Hot Chili Peppers — "The Adventures of Rain Dance Maggie"
Lady Gaga — "Marry the Night"
Selena Gomez & the Scene — "Hit the Lights"
Snow Patrol — "Called Out in the Dark"
Justin Bieber — "Mistletoe / Never Say Never"
David Guetta (featuring Taio Cruz, Ludacris and Jessie J) — "Sweat (David Guetta Remix) / Little Bad Girl / Without You"
Queen + Adam Lambert — "The Show Must Go On / We Will Rock You / We Are the Champions"

Digital show
Snow Patrol — "This Isn't Everything You Are"
Jason Derülo — "Don't Wanna Go Home"

Appearances 
Louise Roe and Tim Kash — Red carpet hosts
Nicole Polizzi and Jennifer Farley — presented Best Live Act
David Hasselhoff — presented Best Female
Katy Perry — presented Global Icon Award
Ashley Rickards and Sheamus — presented Best Male
Amy Lee — introduced Red Hot Chili Peppers
Jeremy Scott and From Above — presented Best New Act
Hayden Panettiere — presented Best Song
Malcolm-Jamal Warner and Tracee Ellis Ross — presented Best Worldwide Act
Jessie J — introduced the Amy Winehouse tribute
Bar Refaeli and Irina Shayk — presented Best Video

See also
2011 MTV Video Music Awards

References

External links
MTV Europe Music Awards Official show site

MTV Europe Music Awards
MTV Europe Music Awards
MTV Europe Music Awards
MTV Europe Music Awards
MTV Europe Music Awards